Wells Lake is a lake in Rice County, in the U.S. state of Minnesota.

Like Wells Township, Wells Lake was named for James "Bully" Wells, a pioneer settler.

References

Lakes of Minnesota
Lakes of Rice County, Minnesota